Hoosier Theater Building is a historic theatre and attached commercial / residential building located at Whiting, Lake County, Indiana. It was built in 1924, and is a three-story, rectangular, brown brick building.  It has a flat roof and three storefronts, along with the -story arched theater entrance trimmed in terra cotta and marquee. The theater is a plain -story brick structure attached to the end and rear of the commercial / residential section.

It was listed in the National Register of Historic Places in 1987.

References

External links
Hoosier Theater website
Cinema Treasures entry

Theatres on the National Register of Historic Places in Indiana
Theatres completed in 1924
Buildings and structures in Lake County, Indiana
National Register of Historic Places in Lake County, Indiana
Whiting, Indiana